The 2012 HP Open was a women's tennis tournament played on outdoor hard courts sponsored by Hewlett-Packard. It was the fourth edition of the HP Open, and part of the WTA International tournaments of the 2012 WTA Tour. It was held at the Utsubo Tennis Center in Osaka, Japan, from October 8 through October 14, 2012. Heather Watson won the singles title.

Champions

Singles

  Heather Watson defeated  Chang Kai-chen 7–5, 5–7, 7–6(7–4)

Doubles

 Raquel Kops-Jones /  Abigail Spears defeated  Kimiko Date-Krumm /  Heather Watson 6–1, 6–4

Singles main-draw entrants

Seeds

 Rankings are as of October 1, 2012

Other entrants
The following players received wildcards into the singles main draw:
  Kurumi Nara
  Francesca Schiavone
  Tamarine Tanasugarn

The following players received entry from the qualifying draw:
  Nudnida Luangnam
  Olga Puchkova
  Luksika Kumkhum
  Zhou Yimiao

Withdrawals
  Tímea Babos
  Petra Cetkovská
  Melinda Czink
  Marina Erakovic
  Olga Govortsova
  Michaëlla Krajicek
  Mandy Minella
  Shahar Pe'er
  Sloane Stephens
  CoCo Vandeweghe
  Galina Voskoboeva
  Aleksandra Wozniak

Retirements
  Francesca Schiavone (right wrist injury)

Doubles main-draw entrants

Seeds

1 Rankings are as of October 1, 2012

Other entrants
The following pair received wildcard into the doubles main draw:
  Kurumi Nara /  Erika Sema

Retirements
  Eleni Daniilidou (right hamstring strain)

External links

 
HP Open
HP Open
2012 in Japanese tennis